Dance with Me, Henry is a 1956 film starring the comedy team of Abbott and Costello. It is the final film that they starred in together, although Costello starred in one more film before his death, The 30 Foot Bride of Candy Rock.

Plot
Lou Henry is the owner of Kiddyland, an amusement park, and Bud Flick is his friend and partner. Together they share a home with two orphan children, Duffer and Shelly. Welfare worker Miss Mayberry does not think that their home is a suitable environment for the children and attempts to remove them. One of the reasons is that Bud is a gambler and owes $10,000 to Big Frank, who offers to forget the debt if Bud agrees to help launder $200,000 that Big Frank took from a Chicago bank. Bud agrees to meet Big Frank's man, Mushie, at Kiddyland to pick up the money and a plane ticket. Lou, however, informs District Attorney Proctor of the plan and he arrives at Kiddyland during Bud and Mushie's meeting. Mushie sees the DA and hides the money just before he murders Proctor and frames Lou for it. Miss Mayberry uses Lou's arrest as a reason to take the children from his home.

Bud informs Mushie that he knows that he really killed Proctor, and Mushie threatens to kill him.  However, Big Frank and Dutch kill Mushie. They kidnap Bud and demand that he tell them where the money is hidden. Meanwhile, Lou is released by the police, who believe that he will lead them to Bud. Dutch then kidnaps Lou and takes him to their hideout, where Bud is also being held. Bud lies and tells Big Frank that he knows where the money is and they all head to Kiddyland, with the police following them every step of the way. Bud then tricks Big Frank into confessing to everything while they are inside the park's recording booth, after which Lou grabs the recording and escapes into the park. Shelly and Duffer have also escaped from Miss Mayberry and are now inside the park playing when they see Lou being chased. They return to the orphanage to get help from the other children, and they all head back to Kiddyland. The children then wreak havoc in the park, foiling the gangsters at every turn. The police capture them, and the reward money that Bud and Lou receive is donated to the orphanage. Miss Mayberry, seeing what a good role model Lou really is, returns custody of the orphans to him.

Cast

Main
 Bud Abbott as Bud Flick
 Lou Costello as Lou Henry
 Gigi Perreau as Shelley
Marni Nixon as Shelley (singing voice)
 Rusty Hamer as Duffer
 Mary Wickes as Miss Mayberry

Supporting
 Ted de Corsia as Big Frank
 Ron Hargrave as Ernie the ukulele player
 Frank Wilcox as Father Mullahy
 Sherry Alberoni as Bootsie
 Eddie Marr as Garvey
 Richard Reeves as Mushie
 Robert Shayne as Proctor
 Walter Reed as Drake
 Paul Sorensen as Dutch

Uncredited
 Robert Bice as Policeman
 John Cliff as Knucks
 Phil Garris as Mickey
 Jess Kirkpatrick as Policeman
 David McMahon as Savoldi
 Gilman Rankin as McKay
 Rod Williams as Janitor

Production
Dance with Me, Henry was filmed from May 23 through June 22, 1956. It was Abbott and Costello's 36th feature film and their first after being dropped by Universal Pictures in 1955 following the completion of Abbott and Costello Meet the Mummy. Independent film producer Bob Goldstein hired the duo for this film, which was released through United Artists. It turned out to be the last film that Abbott and Costello made together as a team, as they ended their partnership in July 1957. The film's title was taken from the 1955 Etta James song "The Wallflower (Dance with Me, Henry)", although the film's plot has nothing to do with the song.

During filming, Abbott and Costello's routine Who's on First? was inducted into the National Baseball Hall of Fame in Cooperstown, New York, where a clip still runs continuously.

A bit part in the film went to the "just released from contract" Mouseketeer Sherry Allen, who was advised by Lou Costello to return to the use (professionally) of her true surname, "Alberoni". She took his advice, and has been known professionally since that time by her birth name.

Release
Dance with Me, Henry received mixed reviews when it was released theatrically in December 1956. A.H. Weiler, reviewing the film for The New York Times, complained: "it is perfectly clear that any attempt to lend dramatic dimension to the simple and egregious fantasy expected of an Abbott and Costello venture can be fraught with the makings of a loud backfire." The New York Herald Tribune was more conciliatory, noting "this time, the team is more sedate" while praising Costello for eschewing slapstick comedy and "developing along the lines of a Chaplinesque character."

In 1956, during Ralph Edwards' This Is Your Life show on NBC which featured a retrospective of Lou Costello's life, the comedy team mentioned the recent release of this film.

Home media
Dance with Me, Henry was released on DVD in June 2005 by MGM Entertainment.  It was released a second time on DVD, as well as on Blu-ray, on June 21, 2015.

See also
List of American films of 1956

References

Further reading
 Stephen Cox and John Lofflin. The Abbott and Costello Story. Cumberland House Publishing, 1997.

External links

1956 films
American black-and-white films
Abbott and Costello films
1950s English-language films
Films about orphans
Films directed by Charles Barton
Films scored by Paul Dunlap
United Artists films
1956 comedy films
1950s American films
American comedy films